Miss Thailand Universe 2009, the 10th Miss Universe Thailand pageant held at Sofitel Centara Grand Bangkok, in Bangkok, Thailand on March 28, 2009. The contestants arrived at Ko Samui, Surat Thani a week earlier to do activities before coming back to Bangkok for rehearsals. 

In the final round, broadcast live on BBTV Channel 7, Chutima Durongdej, was crowned Miss Thailand Universe 2009 by Gavintra Photijak, Miss Thailand Universe 2008.

In this August, Chutima Durongdej, representative of Thailand at the Miss Universe 2009 pageant at Nassau, Bahamas and won Miss Photogenic Award.

Results

Placements
Color keys

Special awards

Judges
Poranee Lumsum
Patara Sila-on - President S&P Public Company Limited Thailand.
Panya Vijintanasarn
Apasra Hongsakula - Miss Universe 1965
Petcharaporn Watcharapol 
Siam Sangworiboot - Publisher Theater
Sudarat Burapachaisri 
Nguyen Thi Giang My - Miss Vietnam 1992
Farung Yuthithum - Miss Thailand Universe 2007
Kelly Rattapong Tanapat - Casting a man reputation

Delegates

External links 
 
 T-Pageant Club

2009
2009 in Bangkok
2009 beauty pageants
March 2009 events in Thailand
Beauty pageants in Thailand